Arctia oberthueri is a moth of the  family Erebidae. It was described by Charles Oberthür in 1890. It is found in Algeria and Tunisia.

This species, along with the others of the genus Atlantarctia, was moved to Arctia as a result of phylogenetic research published by Rönkä et al. in 2016.

References

External links

Lepiforum e.V.

Arctiina
Moths described in 1890
Taxa named by Charles Oberthür
Moths of Africa